The Pakistan national baseball team is the national team representing Pakistan in international baseball tournaments and competitions. They are ranked as the top and one of the most successful baseball teams in South Asia, winning the first SAARC Baseball Championship 8-2 against Sri Lanka in 2011. The team is currently ranked #27 in the world by the World Baseball Softball Confederation.

The Pakistani team has participated in many of the international and regional tournaments and has achieved many successes. It has won the Asian Baseball Championship (C level) title in 2010, where they won 10-0 against Hong Kong in the final round, and five titles at the Asian Baseball Cup, winning the last tournament in 2015. The team qualified for the World Baseball Classic qualifier round for the first time where they lost 0–10 against Brazil and 0–14 while competing against Great Britain in 2016.

The team is governed and controlled by the Pakistan Federation Baseball, which is represented in the Baseball Federation of Asia (BFA), having been ranked #5 in Asia, just behind China.

Results and fixtures
The following is a list of professional baseball match results currently active in the latest version of the WBSC World Rankings, as well as any future matches that have been scheduled.

Legend

2022

2019

2018

Regional competition

Asian Baseball Championship

Pakistan have participated at the Asian Baseball Championship since 2003, and have competed in the competition ever since. The national team has struggled in competing against top Asian teams such as Japan, Chinese Taipei, and Korea, among others. Pakistan secured fifth position after coming victorious against Indonesia in the 2015 Asian Baseball Championship.

Asian Games

In all four Asian Games to include baseball, Pakistan have competed in the 2010 and 2014 tournaments, though they have not won the tournament once Pakistan secured their largest win 25-0 against Mongolia in Seoul.

West Asia Baseball Cup

Pakistan have dominated the Asian Baseball Cup since its inception, and have competed in every year. Since 1997, Pakistan have never missed out on placing in the top 3 in any tournament, and is the only team to have achieved this feat. Pakistan also holds the record for most consecutive Asian Baseball Cup titles, having won five times in total, while the national team have been defending their title since the last four tournaments.

International tournament results

World Baseball Classic

Current squad

Honors and recognition
Asian Baseball Championship
 1st place, 2010 (C level)
 2nd place, 2009 (C level)
Asian Games
 5th place, 2010, 2014
Asian Baseball Cup
 1st place, 2006, 2010, 2012, 2013, 2015 
 2nd place, 2001, 2002, 2004, 2009, 2017
 3rd place, 1997
SAARC Baseball Championship
 1st place, 2011

Records 
 Largest win — 25 - 0 Mongolia , (Seoul, 24 September 2014)
 Worst defeat — 0 - 17 (F/5) South Korea , (Guangzhou, 16 November 2010)

See also
Asian Baseball Championship
Baseball at the Asian Games
Asian Baseball Cup
SAARC Baseball Championship
World Baseball Classic

References

External links
 Official Site 
 IBAF Rankings

National baseball teams in Asia
Baseball
Baseball in Pakistan